The Department of Higher Education of the state of Tamil Nadu is one of the Department of the Government of Tamil Nadu

History 
 The Directorate of Technical Education was established on 14 October 1957
 The Higher Education Department was formed in 1997, after bifurcation from the Education, Science & Technology Department of Secretariat

Objective of the Department 
The basic objective of the Department is to formulate policies, laws, 
regulations and various programmes based on the needs of the society now and then, for achieving the following goals of the Government in the field of Higher Education in Tamil Nadu:
 To provide Higher and Technical Education.  
 To provide higher education for the youth from poor families to have an equal opportunity to pursue higher education.  
 To achieve the Higher Education access rate 25% by 2020.  
 To improve the infrastructure facilities in colleges. 
 To improve and enrich the syllabus. 
 To improve the quality of Higher Education and Technical Education  
 To popularize Science and Technology among the people in General and students in particular in Urban and Rural areas in this State. 
 To create Scientific temper among the students and encourage research activities in Science and Technology in this State.

Sub – Departments

Undertakings & Bodies

Ministers for Higher Education

See also 
 Government of Tamil Nadu
 List of Tamil Nadu Government's Educational Institutions
 Tamil Nadu Government's Departments
 Ministry of Human Resource Development (India)
 Department of Finance (Kerala)
 Department of Higher Education (India)

References

External links
   www.tn.gov.in/departments/hedu.html  (Official Website of the Tamil Nadu Higher Education Department)
    http://www.tn.gov.in/rti/proact_hedu.htm  ( RTI site of the Tamil Nadu Higher Education Department)
 Official website of Government of Tamil Nadu

Tamil Nadu state government departments
Education in Tamil Nadu
1997 establishments in Tamil Nadu
Tamil Nadu